The Lester and Hazel Murphy House is a historic house located in Hood River, Oregon, United States.

Description and history 
The -story house displays many of the distinctive characteristics of the Dutch Colonial Revival style, with its rectilinear form, bilateral symmetry, gambrel roof with eave returns, paired quarter-circle windows on the gable ends and continuous front and rear shed dormers. It was listed on the National Register of Historic Places on October 25, 1990.

See also

National Register of Historic Places listings in Hood River County, Oregon

References

External links

1925 establishments in Oregon
Houses completed in 1925
Houses in Hood River County, Oregon
Houses on the National Register of Historic Places in Oregon
National Register of Historic Places in Hood River County, Oregon
Dutch Colonial Revival architecture in the United States